The Choral River is a tributary of the Narmada River of Central India.

Course
Choral river rises in the Vindhyachal Range of Indore District and after flowing in northeast direction through the mountains, it turns south after exiting the Vindhyas near Patalpani waterfall and joins with Narmada River in Barwaha city . The Choral river has a length of 55 km.

Dam
Choral Dam, constructed in the upper reaches of the river, is a popular picnic destination around Indore City.

Surroundings
Patalpani waterfall is popular picnic spot on the course of Choral River.

References

Rivers of Madhya Pradesh
Tributaries of the Narmada River
Rivers of India